Stephan Kunz (born 31 January 1972) is a Liechtensteiner cross-country skier. He competed at the 1994 Winter Olympics, the 1998 Winter Olympics and the 2002 Winter Olympics.

References

External links
 

1972 births
Living people
Liechtenstein male cross-country skiers
Olympic cross-country skiers of Liechtenstein
Cross-country skiers at the 1994 Winter Olympics
Cross-country skiers at the 1998 Winter Olympics
Cross-country skiers at the 2002 Winter Olympics
People from Vaduz